is a former Japanese football player. She played for Japan national team.

National team career
Kaneda was born on March 11, 1965. In June 1981, when she was 16 years old, she was selected for the Japan national team for the 1981 AFC Championship. On June 7, she debuted against Chinese Taipei. That match was Japan's first match in an International A Match. She played in two matches during that championship. In September, she also played in two matches against England and Italy. However Japan was defeated by a score of 0–9 against Italy. That was the biggest defeat in the history of the Japan national team. She played in four games for Japan in 1981.

National team statistics

References

1965 births
Living people
Japanese women's footballers
Japan women's international footballers
Shimizudaihachi Pleiades players
Women's association footballers not categorized by position